Hemijana griseola is a moth in the family Eupterotidae. It was described by Rothschild in 1917. It is found in South Africa.

The wingspan about 54 mm. The forewings are yellowish brown-grey, with a subbasal chocolate patch on the inner margin, an antemedian transverse line to the base of vein two and a strongly angled and sinuate postmedian brown line beyond which is a less strongly marked and less sinuate line on the outer edge of which between vein six and the costa are three dark-brown dots. The hindwings are yellowish cinnamon, with darker hairs on the abdominal area and a median shadow line, as well as a dark-cinnamon postmedian line.

References

Endemic moths of South Africa
Moths described in 1917
Janinae